The Greater Pittsburgh Chamber of Commerce is a Pittsburgh area non-profit that promotes business and community development throughout Southwestern Pennsylvania.

Founded on December 5, 1874 the chamber received its charter on July 8, 1876 due to the state's passage of a new constitution during 1874-75.  From 1874 until 1904 the chamber had offices at the Germania Bank Building in Downtown Pittsburgh.  On June 20, 1904 it relocated to the Oliver Building.  March 14, 1906 offices moved to the Keenan Building at Liberty Avenue and Seventh Street.  On July 8, 1916 construction started on the Chamber of Commerce Building and opened May 1, 1917 with a membership of 3,000.  By 1918 membership had exceeded 5,000.

The chamber hosted President Grant on December 13, 1879, President Howard Taft on October 31, 1911 and Treasury Secretary John Connally on January 31, 1972.

In 2000 the chamber partnered with the Allegheny Conference, the Pennsylvania Economy League of Greater Pittsburgh and the Pittsburgh Regional Alliance, a partnership that was extended in 2003 with a joint venture that merged memberships and leadership of all four organizations.

See also
Duquesne Club
Economic Club of Pittsburgh
Allegheny HYP Club
RIDC

References

External links
Official site
50th Anniversary Book

Pittsburgh
Organizations based in Pittsburgh
Economy of Pittsburgh
Organizations established in 1874
1874 establishments in Pennsylvania